Chromodoris burni is a species of colourful sea slug, a dorid nudibranch, a marine gastropod mollusc in the family Chromodorididae.

Distribution
This species was described from Centipede Reef, Townsville, Queensland, Australia. It has been found on a few occasions, and only from Queensland.

Description
This species is similar in colouration to Chromodoris striatella but differs in having orange lines on the gills and orange rhinophore clubs whilst in C. striatella the gills and rhinophores are pale brown with fine white spots.

References

External links
 

Chromodorididae
Gastropods described in 1982